Rebola may refer to:

 Repola, Finland
 Rebola, Equatorial Guinea
 Rebola (MC Loma e as Gêmeas Lacração's song)
 Rebola (IZA's song)